Shawn Foltz-Emmons (born 21 December 1967) is an American former professional tennis player.

Tennis career
A right-handed player from Indianapolis, Foltz was a rising star in junior tennis who was unable to fulfil her promise on the professional tour, in a career which was curtailed by serious wrist injuries. She reached a career high ranking of 55 while touring as an amateur and was runner-up at the 1984 Japan Open. 

Following a series of wrist surgeries for a congenital bone disorder, she took up a scholarship to the University of Indiana and despite further injury complications made it to the top of the collegiate tennis rankings in 1988.

From 1989 to 1991 she toured professionally and she is now a psychologist living in Arizona.

Acting
Foltz starred as tennis player Missy in the 1982 film Spring Fever, with Carling Bassett.

WTA Tour finals

Singles (0-1)

ITF finals

Singles: 1 (0–1)

Doubles: 5 (1–4)

References

External links
 
 

1967 births
Living people
American female tennis players
Indiana Hoosiers women's tennis players
Tennis players from Indianapolis